= Pigion =

Pigion can refer to:

- Columbidae, a zoological family
- pidgin, a linguistic concept
